Deadman (stylized as deadman) is a Japanese rock band founded in Nagoya in 2000. The group gained notoriety for popularizing the Nagoya kei subgenre of visual kei, which is a lot "darker" than most and focuses more on musical composition. Deadman also quickly became known for vocalist Mako's heavily melancholic lyrical themes, with the music itself touching on alternative rock in sound. The group disbanded in 2006 without explanation. Mako and guitarist aie reunited as Deadman in 2019.

History

Original run (2000–2006)
Guitarist and leader aie, vocalist Mako and bassist Yukino (formerly known as "Yuki") were all previously in the band Kein. In 2000 they formed Deadman with drummer Toki, whom aie previously played with in Lamiel. They played their first concert on January 6, 2001. Shortly after the April release of their first single, "Subliminal Effect", Yukino left the group and was replaced by Takamasa previously of Lady. Yukino went on to the bands Gullet, lynch., and DimmDivision. In November 2001, Deadman released their first mini-album, Site of Scaffold. After a handful of singles (which had different variants), the band's first full-length studio album No Alternative was released on March 8, 2003. 701125, their second mini-album, was originally sold on tour or by mail order in April 2004. It would later receive a proper release on June 8, 2005 under the title 701125+2.

In April 2005, Takamasa left and it was not until July when kazuya replaced him on bass. At the end of the year they released their second full-length album, In The Direction of Sunrise and Night Light. At the beginning of 2006, Deadman played a couple of shows in Europe. But in March they announced they would be disbanding and on May 23, 2006 performed their last concert at Shibuya O-East. Mako has stated that he showed "too much of [his] inner self" in Deadman and struggled mentally both during its run and after the band broke up.

aie went on to form the band The Studs in 2007 with ex-bassist Yukino. They went on hiatus in 2009. He then formed both HighFashionParalyze and The God and Death Stars in 2010, all the while performing occasional solo shows. HighFashionParalyze recruited Sakura and kazu (Kagerou) in 2016 and changed their name to Gibkiy Gibkiy Gibkiy. On May 29, 2008, Mako released a photobook called Buried Alive by Words, which came with a CD of a song called "Buried with the Light" that features Közi on guitar and bass. kazuya released a solo album, under the name Gift, called A Man's Walking is Succession of Falls on June 20, 2008. In October 2021, Mako formed Loa-Roar with former Merry Go Round drummer Kyo. After 22 years, Mako, Yukino (who went back to using the name "Yuki") and aie reunited Kein in 2022.

Reunion (2019–present)
After 13 years, Mako and aie announced a reunion as Deadman in March 2019. aie said he had been asked by event organizers to reunite the band several times in the past decade, but he just happened to be talking to Mako and Merry bassist Tetsu about doing something together when the offer came again in 2018 and, to his surprise, Mako agreed. The vocalist said he turned down previous offers because he did not want to reignite the mental "trauma" he suffered from during and after Deadman, but agreed this time because with just aie, Tetsu and himself, it would not be the "real" Deadman and he therefore expected it to be fun with a party-like atmosphere. After a performance on June 22 at Nagoya Bottom Line, where aie revealed that the reunion would last for a year until September 2020, they played a one-man live at Ebisu Liquidroom on September 9, 2019. The duo were supported both times by Tetsu on bass and Asanao (lynch.) on drums. After two more performances in October and November, Deadman went on a three-date tour throughout December. In February 2020, the duo embarked on a joint tour with Gibkiy Gibkiy Gibkiy. Another joint tour, this time with Cali Gari, was set to take place in March. However, those dates and others were first postponed and then cancelled due to the COVID-19 pandemic in Japan. As a result, the duo decided to extend their reunion into 2021, which marked Deadman's 20th anniversary. They also announced plans to re-record some of their old songs, which were decided by a poll of their fan club.

A concert to mark the anniversary took place at Nagoya Diamond Hall on January 6, 2021, exactly 20 years since Deadman's first-ever performance. They performed a concert on May 23 at Tsutaya O-East, which is the same venue where they played their final concert in 2006. For the performance, the band replicated the lighting from the show 15 years earlier and gathered as much of the same staff as they could. The joint tour with Cali Gari took place in June, during which the two bands released the collaborative song "Shikeidai no Elevator", and Deadman held their own tour in July. At a December 4 concert at Shinjuku Loft celebrating the 20th anniversary of David Skull No Records, former Deadman members kazuya and Toki joined Mako and aie onstage during the encore.

I am Here, Deadman's first album in 15 years, was released on January 15, 2022 by Maverick DC Group. Featuring re-recordings of old songs and one new track, it was recorded with kazuya and Toki on bass and drums respectively. aie stated that although both work as salarymen, they were able to participate by recording only three songs a month for about a year and a half. The album was supported by a three-date tour from January 22 to February 11. A special concert was held at Spotify O-East on May 23 where two different line-ups of Deadman performed; Mako and aie performed a set with former members kazuya and Toki, and another with current support members kazu and Asanao. Between September and November, Deadman held three two-man lives at Shinjuku Blaze, each with a different young visual kei band; the first with Razor, the second with Arlequin, and the third with Dezert.

In 2023, Deadman held the Dead Reminiscence tour exclusively for members of their fanclub between February 21 and 26. The Rabid Dog Walking a Tightrope tour will take place between March 20 and April 16, and "Rapid Dog", a new song recorded with kazu and Asanao, will be given out for free at the venues. Dead Reminiscence, a six-track album of old songs re-recorded with kazu and Asanao, will be sold on the tour before being offered by mail order only.

Musical style
Deadman cites Buck-Tick, Chage and Aska and Kurt Cobain as inspiring them. Their music incorporates several different genres of rock, drawing heavily from alternative rock and indie rock. A style reminiscent of gothic rock, punk and post-punk can also be seen, in what is much of Deadman's musical sporadic-ism. Often incorporated into individual songs are several "movements" that seem to drift back and forth, with erratic vocals and sounds.

Mako's lyrics usually touch on the "psychological instability of mankind, the mortality of humans, and religion", particularly Christianity and Shintoism references are made often. He said that some of them are based on actual experiences that he had, and feels one should never lie when writing lyrics. The title of Deadman's album 701125 is a reference to the date author Yukio Mishima died, November 25, 1970.

Members
 – vocals (2000–2006, 2019–present)
aie – guitar (2000–2006, 2019–present)

Live support members
 – bass
kazu – bass
 – drums
 – drums
Lotto – drums

Former members
Toki – drums (2000–2006)
 – bass (2000–2001)
Takamasa – bass (2001–2005)
kazuya – bass (2005–2006)

Discography

Studio albums and mini-albums
 Site of Scaffold (November 21, 2001)
 No Alternative (March 8, 2003), Oricon Albums Chart Peak Position: No. 160
 701125 (April 2004; sold on tour or by mail order)
 701125+2 (June 8, 2005)
 In the Direction of Sunrise and Night Light (December 14, 2005) No. 189

Other albums
 
 No Alternative 2.0 (November 30, 2009; remix album)
 I am Here (January 15, 2022; self-cover album) No. 67
 Dead Reminiscence (March 20, 2023; self-cover album, sold on tour or by mail order)

Singles
 "Subliminal Effect" (April 25, 2001)
 "In Media" (August 20, 2001)
 "Jekyll and Hyde of Early Afternoon" (White Version, original songs July 27, 2002; split single with Blast)
 "Jekyll and Hyde of Early Afternoon" (Black Version, cover songs July 27, 2002; split single with Blast)
 
 "Family" (Osaka Edition, sold only on April 13, 2003)
 "Family" (Nagoya Edition, sold only on April 23, 2003)
 "Family" (Tokyo Edition, sold only on April 26, 2003)
 , Oricon Singles Chart Peak Position: No. 102
 
 "℃+1" (sold only on March 10, 2004)
 "℃" (October 6, 2004) No. 85
  No. 117
 "Rapid Dog" (distributed for free on tour from March 20 – April 16, 2023)

DVDs
 2 Clips (April 2004; sold only on tour)
 0605231830 (December 27, 2006)
 Endroll (December 27, 2006)

References

External links
 Official website
 Old official website
 Official news blog
 aie official site
 Gift official MySpace

Visual kei musical groups
Japanese alternative rock groups
Japanese indie rock groups
Japanese punk rock groups
Musical groups established in 2000
Musical groups disestablished in 2006
Musical groups reestablished in 2019
Musical quartets
Musical groups from Aichi Prefecture